Hydrophylax is a genus of true frogs (family Ranidae). They are found in South and Southeast Asia.

Species
The following species are recognised in the genus Hydrophylax:
 Hydrophylax bahuvistara Padhye et al., 2015
 Hydrophylax gracilis (Gravenhorst, 1829)
 Hydrophylax leptoglossa (Cope, 1868)
 Hydrophylax malabaricus (Tschudi, 1838)

References

True frogs
 
Amphibian genera
Amphibians of Asia
Taxa named by Leopold Fitzinger